Alvhem is a locality situated in Ale Municipality, Västra Götaland County, Sweden. It had 202 inhabitants in 2010.

References 

Populated places in Västra Götaland County
Populated places in Ale Municipality